The 1980 NCAA Division II Soccer Championship was the ninth annual tournament held by the NCAA to determine the top men's Division II college soccer program in the United States.

Lock Haven State defeated Florida International in the final, 1–0 (after one overtime period), to win their first Division II national title (the Bald Eagles won the Division III tournament in both 1977 and 1978).

The final was played at Florida International University in Miami, Florida on November 29, 1980.

Bracket

Final

See also  
 1980 NCAA Division I Soccer Tournament
 1980 NCAA Division III Soccer Championship
 1980 NAIA Soccer Championship

References 

NCAA Division II Men's Soccer Championship
NCAA Division II Men's Soccer Championship
NCAA Division II Men's Soccer Championship
NCAA Division II Men's Soccer Championship
Soccer in Florida